Opaon varicolor is a species of short-horned grasshopper in the family Acrididae. It is found in tropical South America.

References

External links

 

Acrididae